Maubray Airfield  is a private airfield located near Tournai, Hainaut, Wallonia (southern Belgium). It mainly serves glider flying by the local aeroclub.

See also
List of airports in Belgium

References

External links 
 Airport record for Maubray Airport at Landings.com

Airports in Hainaut (province)
Tournai